Arquay Harris is an American software developer and former Senior Director of Engineering at Slack. As of April 2021, she is Vice President of Engineering at Webflow.

In 2018, Harris was named one of "America's Top 50 Women in Tech" by Forbes Magazine.

Early life and education 
Harris graduated from James Madison University with a Bachelor of Arts and Science. She went on to study at the Academy of Art University, continuing her technical education as well as practicing fine art painting in 3D, graduating with a degree in Fine Arts.

Career 
Harris started her career in technical production at CNET before moving into a software development role at CBS. She moved from the media industry to the technology industry when she joined Google, where she ultimately worked as a web development manager, leading a team of information architects, software developers, and designers. In June 2016, she joined Slack, where she ultimately held the position of Senior Director of Engineering, Expansion. In her first week at Slack, she started a project to redesign Slack's user interface using principles of responsive design.

In April 2021, she joined Webflow, where she holds the position of Vice President of Engineering, Growth.

Awards and recognition 

 Forbes Magazine's "America's Top 50 Women in Tech 2018"

References 

Year of birth missing (living people)
Living people
American software engineers